The 2015 Tour of Norway was the fifth edition of the Tour of Norway cycle stage race. It was a part of the 2015 UCI Europe Tour as a 2.HC event. It was won by Denmark's Jesper Hansen, riding for the  team.

Schedule
The race was held over five stages.

Teams
21 teams were selected to take place in the 2015 Tour of Norway. Six of these were UCI WorldTeams, eight were UCI Professional Continental teams, and seven were UCI Continental teams.

Stages

Stage 1
20 May 2015 — Årnes to Sarpsborg,

Stage 2
21 May 2015 — Drammen to Langesund,

Stage 3
22 May 2015 — Skien to Rjukan,

Stage 4
23 May 2015 — Rjukan to Geilo,

Stage 5
24 May 2015 — Flå to Hønefoss Airport, Eggemoen,

Classification leadership
In the 2015 Tour of Norway, four different jerseys were awarded. For the general classification, calculated by adding each cyclist's finishing times on each stage, and allowing time bonuses (10, 6 and 4 seconds respectively) for the first three finishers on mass-start stages, the leader received a yellow jersey. Additionally, there was a points classification, awarding a green jersey, and a mountains classification, the leadership of which was marked by a polka dot jersey. The fourth jersey represented the young rider classification, marked by a white jersey. This was decided in the same way as the general classification, but only young riders were eligible. There was also a classification for teams.

Final standings

General classification

Young rider classification

Points classification

Mountains classification

Teams classification

References

External links 
 

Tour of Norway
Tour of Norway
2015 in Norwegian sport